Futbolo klubas Koralas, commonly known as Koralas was a Lithuanian football team from the port city of Klaipėda.

History
Club was established in 2015. In this season they was in LFF III lyga (4th tier), was leaders for a long time, but finished in third position.

Next year, in 2016, they was in LFF II lyga (3rd tier). Was runners-up and got promotion to Pirma lyga (2nd tier).

In 2017 team was in Pirma lyga. First half of the season was problematical, but in summer transfer time they get new forces and finished in 6th place.

2018 was problematical. After losing 0–12 to FC Kupiškis they was retired until second half of the season. After summer they won once, but ater lost games against "Nevėžis" 0–9 and Panevėžys 0–10. finally, on 19 September 2018 club was dissolved from Pirma lyga competition. They played more than half matches, so results are valid. In tournament table they in 14th position.

Honours

Domestic
 Antra lyga:
 Runner-up: 2016

Recent seasons

Squad (2017)

|-----
! colspan="9" bgcolor="#B0D3FB" align="left" |
|----- bgcolor="#DFEDFD"

|-----
! colspan="9" bgcolor="#B0D3FB" align="left" |
|----- bgcolor="#DFEDFD"

 (loan from FK Atlantas).

|-----
! colspan="9" bgcolor="#B0D3FB" align="left" |
|----- bgcolor="#DFEDFD"
 (loan from FK Atlantas).

Managers
  Marsel Balasanov 2016
  Saulius Mikalajūnas (formally); Kęstutis Ivaškevičius (real) – 2017

References

External links
 Official club profile in facebook
 Fan site in facebook

Football clubs in Lithuania
Football clubs in Klaipėda
2015 establishments in Lithuania
Association football clubs established in 2015